This is a list of Italian television related events from 2002.

Events
4 December - Bruno Cuomo wins the first season of Operazione Trionfo.

Debuts

Television shows

Rai

Drama 

 Resurrection, by the Taviani Brothers, with Silvia Rocca and Timothy Peach, from the Lev Tolstoj’s novel; 2 episodes.
 Perlasca un eroe italiano (An Italian hero) – by Alberto Negrin, with Luca Zingaretti in the title role, Amanda Sandrelli and Giuliana Lojodice, music by Ennio Morricone; 2 episodes
 The apocalypse – by Raffaele Mertes, with Richard Harris (St. John the Evangelist), Vittoria Bevlvedere and Paolo Villaggio. Thirteenth and final chapter of the LUV VIDE’s Bible project.  

 Maria Josè l’ultima regina (The last queen) – by Carlo Lizzani, with Barbora Bobulova in the title role and Alberto Molinari as Umberto II; 2 episodes.

Varieyt 

 Il caso Scarfoglia (The Scarfoglia affair) – satirical variety by Corrado Guzzanti (protagonist and director) with Marco Marzocca and Caterina Guzzanti. A cynical TV journalist, sided by a fanatic priest, investigates about the vanishing of an average man. The simulated enquiry is only the common thread for absurd inventions, as the fake newsreels about the landing on Mars of a fascist expedition (later, Guzzanti adapts those sketches in a movie, Fascisti su Marte).

Mediaset
Grande Fratello (2000–present)

Ending this year

Births

Deaths

See also
2002 in Italy
List of Italian films of 2002

References